Congregation Beth Israel is a Reform synagogue located at 3901 Shoal Creek Boulevard in Austin, Texas. Organized in 1876 and chartered by the state of Texas in 1879, it is the oldest synagogue in Austin.

The synagogue had 51 members in 1907 and was located at East 11th and Trinity. It had no rabbi at the time.  

The senior rabbi is Steven Folberg.

Notes

19th-century synagogues
Reform synagogues in Texas
Religious organizations established in 1876
Religious buildings and structures in Austin, Texas
1876 establishments in Texas